Saatlı is a city and the capital of the Saatly District of Azerbaijan.

References 

World Gazetteer: Azerbaijan – World-Gazetteer.com

Populated places in Saatly District